Borguet is a French surname. Notable people with the surname include:

Eric Borguet, American chemical physicist
Henri Borguet, Belgian entrepreneur
Joseph Borguet (born 1951), Belgian cyclist

French-language surnames